Gibson Alberto Rosado Alba (born January 18, 1960) is a former professional baseball pitcher who played for the St. Louis Cardinals in .  He appeared in three games as a reliever, pitching 3.1 innings in his career.

External links

1960 births
Living people
Algodoneros de Unión Laguna players
Buffalo Bisons (minor league) players
Denver Zephyrs players
Diablos Rojos del México players
Dominican Republic expatriate baseball players in Mexico
Dominican Republic expatriate baseball players in the United States
El Paso Diablos players
Erie Cardinals players
Florence Blue Jays players
Gastonia Cardinals players
Gulf Coast Pirates players
Kinston Blue Jays players
Knoxville Blue Jays players
Louisville Redbirds players
Major League Baseball pitchers
Major League Baseball players from the Dominican Republic
Mexican League baseball pitchers
People from Santiago de los Caballeros
Richmond Braves players
St. Louis Cardinals players
St. Petersburg Cardinals players
Syracuse Chiefs players